Kees Roovers (6 March 1890 – 26 February 1978) was a Dutch painter. His work was part of the painting event in the art competition at the 1932 Summer Olympics.

References

1890 births
1978 deaths
20th-century Dutch painters
Dutch male painters
Olympic competitors in art competitions
Painters from Rotterdam
20th-century Dutch male artists